The People Trap (full title The People Trap and other Pitfalls, Snares, Devices and Delusions, as Well as Two Sniggles and a Contrivance) is a collection of science fiction short stories by American writer Robert Sheckley. It was first published in 1968 by Dell.

Stories
It includes the following stories (magazines in which the stories originally appeared given in parentheses):

 "The People Trap" (The Magazine of Fantasy & Science Fiction 1968/6)
 "The Victim from Space" (Galaxy 1957/4)
 "Shall We Have a Little Talk?" (Galaxy 1965/10)
 "Restricted Area" (Amazing Stories 1953/6&7)
 "The Odor of Thought" (Star Science Fiction Stories No.2, edited by Frederik Pohl, 1953)
 "The Necessary Thing" (Galaxy 1955/6)
 "Redfern's Labyrinth"
 "Proof of the Pudding" (Galaxy 1952/8)
 "The Laxian Key" (Galaxy 1954/11)
 "The Last Weapon" (Star Science Fiction Stories No.1, edited by Frederik Pohl, 1953)
 "Fishing Season" (Thrilling Wonder Stories 1953/8)
 "Dreamworld"
 "Diplomatic Immunity" (Galaxy 1953/8)
 "Ghost V" (Galaxy 1954/10)

External links
 

1968 short story collections
Short story collections by Robert Sheckley
American short story collections